Antonia Hylton (born 1993) is an American journalist. She received an Emmy for her work on Vice News Tonight and is currently a correspondent for NBC News. Hylton is the co-reporter for the podcast Southlake, which received a 2022 Peabody Award.

Early life and education 
Hylton was raised outside Boston, one of seven children. Both of her parents are lawyers. Her aunt is journalist Soledad O'Brien. She was an avid reader growing up, and also performed in choir, musical theater, and was a member of dance groups. In 2015 she graduated magna cum laude from Harvard University, where she majored in History and Science and Global Health.

Career 
Directly after graduation she was hired at Mic.com as a producer and writer for their news shows Flip the Script and Future Present. Hylton met activist Darnell Moore working at Mic. Together they developed the docuseries The Movement with Darnell Moore, about grassroots organizing around the United States. The next year, Hylton joined Vice News Tonight as a correspondent and producer covering civil rights and politics. She reported on topics including gang violence and immigration.

Hylton was a correspondent for the news show The Report on Quibi until the platform shut down. She is currently a reporter for NBC News. In 2021 she became the co-reporter for NBC's Southlake, a podcast about how a group of white students' use of a racial epithet began a cascade of controversy around critical race theory in the suburb of Southlake, Texas. The podcast received accolades including a Peabody Award, a Scripps Howard Award, and it was named a finalist for the Pulitzer Prize for Audio Reporting.

Hylton has spoken on bias she has experienced as a Black woman reporter. She has also discussed the importance of authenticity in her reporting work.

Hylton has served as a judge for the American Mosaic Journalism Prize every year since 2019.

Accolades 
 2019 – News and Documentary Emmy Award, Outstanding Feature Story in a Newscast (for Vice News Tonight: Zero Tolerance)
 2020 – Forbes, 30 under 30
 2022 – Finalist, Pulitzer Prize for Audio Reporting (for Southlake)
 2022 – 69th Scripps Howard Award for Excellence in Radio/Podcast Coverage (for Southlake)
 2022 – Peabody Award for Podcast/Radio (for Southlake)

References

External links 
 Official website
 

1993 births
Living people
21st-century American journalists
American women television journalists
African-American women journalists
African-American journalists
Harvard University alumni
NBC News people
21st-century American women
21st-century African-American women
21st-century African-American people